The expression seven sacraments mainly refer to:

 Sacrament
 Sacraments of the Catholic Church
 Sacraments of the Eastern Orthodox Church
 Anglican sacraments
 Sacraments of the Czechoslovak Hussite Church
It can also refer to:

Art 

 Seven Sacraments Altarpiece
 Seven Sacraments (Poussin)
 The Seven Sacraments of Nicolas Poussin

See also 

 Sacrament (disambiguation)